A Richard Nixon mask is a mask with the likeness of Richard Nixon. It was commercially available and quite popular in the waning days of the administration. It is generally made out of vinyl by Cesar Mask (fr), a French company, and is sold worldwide. The most famous Nixon mask was the big nose Nixon comical mask that was made by Cesar in the 1970s. Later, other companies made similar versions made from latex rubber or similar flexible castable compounds.

One of the notable features of most Nixon masks is the classically-caricatured nose. Many of the different versions of the Nixon mask have a wide, grinning smile as well.

Although the masks were widely believed to be only a fad, which would presumably die down as the public attention on Watergate waned and once Nixon left office, the masks managed to outlive their presumed fad status by becoming popular during events such as Halloween and adult masquerade parties. The Nixon mask remains popular today and is worn both for humorous effect and in protest marches and similar "public displays of disaffection". According to Harper's magazine's October 2002 "Harper's Index," Nixon masks were the best-selling political mask for the previous five years for the top U.S. costume wholesaler Morris Costumes.

The masks sparked a commercial demand for masks resembling other famous people, most notably other US presidents. Masks of other presidents have often been most popular during in the term of the current president or the one that immediately precedes it.

In popular culture 
 Bob Dylan - musician and countercultural figure
 Manic Street Preachers - Welsh band in the video "The Love of Richard Nixon," as well as the cover art for the single.
 John E. Fryer - psychiatrist and gay rights activist who wore a Nixon mask to conceal his appearance during a 1972 APA convention
 During Tom Petty & the Heartbreakers' Southern Accents 1985 tour, when "Don't Come Around Here No More" reached the uptempo climax, actors in Nixon and Reagan masks came out and chased each other all over the stage.
 One of the bank robbers in the 1991 action film Point Break, the other robbers wore masks based on other recent presidents (Johnson, Carter, and Reagan). Many fictional uses of the mask reference this film.
In Family Guy Cleveland Brown is shown wearing one in "The Tan Aquatic with Steve Zissou" episode (2007).
In the 2021 Netflix action film Army of Thieves the character Brad Cage is shown wearing a Nixon mask during the second robbery.
The video games Payday: The Heist and Payday 2 have the Nixon mask as an option for character customization.

References

Nixon, Richard
Mask
Nixon
Political masks